Phillip Moir (born 28 December 1958) is  a former Australian rules footballer who played with South Melbourne in the Victorian Football League (VFL).

Notes

External links 		
		
		
		
		
		
		
Living people		
1958 births		
		
Australian rules footballers from Tasmania		
Sydney Swans players
City-South Football Club players